Mirada de mujer is a Mexican telenovela premiered on Azteca Trece on June 9, 1997 and concluded on June 5, 1998. Based on the Colombian drama, entitled Señora Isabel written by Bernardo Romero Pereiro and Mónica Agudelo. The show is produced by Argos Comunicación and TV Azteca. It stars Angélica Aragón, Ari Telch, and Fernando Luján as the titular's character.

Following the success obtained, a sequel was released in 2003, titled Mirada de mujer, el regreso.

Synopsis
A woman stops in front of a mirror, she questions herself, inquires into the traces that her eyes have become, and what she sees paralyzes her. The reflex on the crystal tells her of a story full of dreams, full of promises, children and prosperity, but empty of passion. It's the Story of Maria Ines, a woman in her 50s, her husband, his mistress 20-years-younger, her three adult children and a man 20 years younger, who'll help her discover that there is love and life after turning 50.

That woman is María Inés. Nothing of what has occurred in her 27 years of marriage was moved by her own dreams. Her entire life has been one of dedication to her husband and children. She is fifty and her husband has found in another woman, half his age, freshness and intimacy. To his mistress he gives the vitality he thought was lost, to his wife tiredness and failure. That man is Ignacio Sanmillán. María Inés look at her present and discovers loneliness, although Paulina, her best friend encourages her to keep on living. She is surrounded by complaining grown ups (her children) and a mother that tells her she has not been capable of keeping her family together. She is Mama Lena. But Maria Ines is not alone. Someone starts looking for her. A man who is 20 years younger. This man is Alejandro Salas. Writer, father of a boy, with an enormous desire to plat life a treat, Alejandro is a man that fights for his emotions and his work against hypocrisy, falsehood or prohibition.

But María Inés is not alone in her self-discovery journey. Her best friend, the feisty and maneater Paulina, will also start to question her life and the decisions she made along the way.

To make matters worse, her three children blame her for the break-up of the marriage of hers and their father, but Life will soon show them the truth.

This is "Mirada de Mujer". An intimate story that none of us had the opportunity to view "through the keyhole". "Mirada de Mujer" is different, of the present time, its unbearable as only a mirror can be.

Theme song
The telenovela also gave rise to the song Dime written by Armando Manzanero, and sung by Aranza, which became a great hit in Mexico, Puerto Rico and Central America, and which peaked at #22 in the U.S. Hot Latin Songs Chart. To this date the song is considered a classic, and arguably one of the most important songs to come out of a telenovela, not only for its beautiful melody but also for its profound lyrics that fit the story perfectly.

The Philippine-dubbed airing however, had a different theme song, "Bakit" performed by Rachelle Ann Go.

Cast

Main Cast
Angélica Aragón as María Inés Domínguez de Sanmillán
Ari Telch  as Alejandro Salas
Fernando Luján as Lic. Ignacio Sanmillán
 Margarita Gralia as Paulina
 Evangelina Elizondo as Doña Emilia Elena viuda de Domínguez 'Mamá Elena'
 Verónica Langer as Rosario
 María Renée Prudencio as Adriana Sanmillán
 Bárbara Mori  as Mónica Sanmillán
 Plutarco Haza as Andrés Sanmillán
 Martha Mariana Castro as Daniela

Supporting Cast
 Muriel Fouilland as Ivana
 Álvaro Carcaño Jr as Nicolás
 Olmo Araiza  as Alex Salas
 Carlos Torres Torrija as Marcos
 Paloma Woolrich as Consuelo
 Carmen Madrid as Marcela
 René Gatica  as Francisco
 Mariana Peñalva as Andrea
 Víctor González as Fernando
 Alma Rosa Añorve as Gloria
 Enrique Singer as Enrique
 Dora Montero  as Elvia
 Ana Graham  as Marina
 Guadalupe Noel  as Doña Felisa (1997-1998)

Awards and nominations

References

External links

1997 telenovelas
1997 Mexican television series debuts
1998 Mexican television series endings
Mexican telenovelas
TV Azteca telenovelas
Argos Comunicación telenovelas
Mexican television series based on Colombian television series
Spanish-language telenovelas